Salmon is a surname. Alternative spellings are Salmons, Sammon and Sammons.

Notable persons with that surname
 Alex Salmon (born 1994), English footballer
 André Salmon (1881–1969), French writer
 Barnett Salmon (1829–1897), co-founder of Salmon & Gluckstein, by 1900 the world's largest retail tobacconist
 Benoît Salmon (born 1974), French professional road racing cyclist
 Colin Salmon (born 1962), British actor
 Cyril Salmon (1903–1991), Privy Council of the United Kingdom
 Daniel Elmer Salmon (1850–1914), American veterinary surgeon
 David A. Salmon (1879–unknown), US State Department functionary and accused spy
 David Salmon (tribal chief) (1912–2007), Alaska native Episcopalian priest and tribal chief
 Ebony Salmon (born 2001), English footballer
 Edward L. Salmon, Jr., American Episcopalian bishop
 Edward Togo Salmon (1905–1988), British born ancient historian
 Eleanor Seely Salmon (1910–1984), American geologist
 Ernest Stanley Salmon (1871– 1959), mycologist and hop breeder
 Felix Salmon (contemporary), Scottish-born financial blogger  
 Frederick M. Salmon (1870–1936), American politician  
 Gaston Salmon (1878–1917), Belgian Olympic champion fencer
 George Salmon (1819–1904), Irish mathematician
 Gilly Salmon (contemporary), English academic
 Glen Salmon (born 1977), South African football striker
 H. L. N. Salmon (1894–1943) Canadian military officer. Grand nephew of Nowell Salmon
 Harry Salmon (baseball) (1895–1983), American baseball pitcher
 Harry Salmon (businessman) (1881–1950), British businessman
 Harry Morrey Salmon (1892–1985), naturalist and bird photographer
 Harvey Wallis Salmon (1839–1927), American politician
 Henry Salmon (1910–1944), English footballer
 Herman Salmon (1913–1980), American barnstormer, air racer and Lockheed company test pilot
 Sir Isidore Salmon (1876–1941), British Conservative Member of Parliament
 James Salmon (1805–1888), Scottish architect
 James Salmon (1873–1924), Scottish architect, grandson of James Salmon (1805–1888)
 Jeff Salmon (born 1953), British art dealer
 John Drew Salmon (1802–1859), British botanist and ornithologist
 Kim Salmon (contemporary), Australian indie rock musician and songwriter
 Matt Salmon (born 1958), American politician, former representative from Arizona
 Mike Salmon (racing driver) (1933–2016), British racing driver
 Nathan Salmon (born 1951), American philosopher of language and metaphysician
 Sir Nowell Salmon (1835–1912), English naval officer and recipient of the Victoria Cross
 Paul Salmon (born 1965), Australian rules footballer
 Peter Salmon (disambiguation), multiple people
 Riley Salmon (born 1976), American volleyball player
 Robert Salmon (inventor) (1763–1821), English inventor of agricultural implements
 Robert Salmon (1775–c.1845), English/American maritime artist
 Ted Salmon (born 1943), New Zealand field hockey player  
 Thomas P. Salmon (born 1932), American politician, Governor of Vermont 1973–1977
 Tim Salmon (born 1968), American professional baseball player
 Wesley C. Salmon (1925–2001), American contemporary philosopher of science
 William Charles Salmon (1868–1925), American politician
 Woodie Salmon (born 1952), American member of the Alaska House of Representatives. 
 Yvan Salmon (1848–1870), French journalist who wrote under the nom de plume Victor Noir
 Zoe Salmon (born 1980), British television presenter [born in Northern Ireland]

See also
 Salmon (given name)
 Salman (name), given name and surname
 Salmons (surname)
 Sammon (surname)
 Sammons

English-language surnames
French-language surnames